Ian Lawrence Finkel (August 13, 1948 – November 16, 2020) was an American musician specializing in the xylophone, author, and entertainer.

Early life and education 
Finkel was the son of Fyvush Finkel, and Gertrude (Lieberman) Finkel. His brother, Elliot Finkel, is also a known entertainer. The brothers performed as the comedic-duet the Finkel Boys.

Finkel attended Mannes School of Music at the New School and was a student of Walter Rosenberger. He also studied under Norman Grossman.

Career 
Finkel was known as one of the world’s greatest xylophone virtuosos. He was the musical director for Michael Feinstein. He also worked for Sid Caesar, Tito Puente, and Ginger Roberts. He played with the New York Philharmonic and played with orchestras that accompanied  Whitney Houston, Michael Jackson, and Diana Ross. He had concert tours in Japan, Korea, Canada, Mexico, England, and America.

He was the editor of Solos for the Vibraphone Player and the writer of plays and musicals including Sophie Tucker in Person. His books include Three is The Charm, Sex Stories My Wife Told Me, and Transmutation Blues and Vaudeville 1922, and numerous short stories. In 2009, he authored the humorous book, You're Not Suppose to Be Here.

Personal life 
Finkel was married to Cheryl Ann Allen. The couple had two children.

He died of complications of COVID-19 in Manhattan on November 16, 2020, aged 72, after battling the virus since March while hospitalized for a stroke.

References 

1948 births
2020 deaths
American writers
American percussionists
Mannes School of Music alumni
Deaths from the COVID-19 pandemic in New York (state)